Tarnau:
 German name of Tarnów
 German name of Tarnów Opolski
 German name of Tarnawa, Lubusz Voivodeship, Silesia